Yang Guang (born 11 February 1980) is a former Chinese footballer who played as a defender for Shanghai Shenhua.

References

1980 births
Living people
Chinese footballers
Association football defenders
Shenzhen F.C. players
Shanghai Shenhua F.C. players
Chinese Super League players